Dryophylax chimanta (also known as Roze's coastal house snake) is a species of snake in the family Colubridae. The species is endemic to Venezuela and only known from the Chimantá tepui.

References

Dryophylax
Snakes of South America
Reptiles of Venezuela
Endemic fauna of Venezuela
Reptiles described in 1958
Fauna of the Tepuis
Taxa named by Janis Roze